Fu Baoshi, or Fu Pao-Shih, (1904–1965) was a Chinese painter from Xinyu, Jiangxi Province. He went to Japan to study the History of Oriental Art in the Tokyo School of Fine Arts in 1933. He translated many books from Japanese and carried out his own research. In painting itself, he brought Japanese visual elements to the Chinese ink painting tradition.

He was the director of the Jiangsu Province Chinese Painting School and a vice-chairman of the Federation of Chinese Artists. He also taught in the Art Department of Central University (now Nanjing University). His works of landscape painting employed skillful use of dots and inking methods, creating a new technique encompassing many varieties within traditional rules. He was able to create an old, elegant style through his integration of poetic atmosphere and painting techniques. He held many personal exhibitions in China and won favourable comments.

Fu had strong feelings towards the land of China. During his travel to many places, he recorded the splendors of the rivers and mountains, drawing inspiration from nature and becoming the representative landscape painter of his time.

Art historian 

Fu wrote numerous fine arts theses, the earliest of which, "On the Evolution of Chinese Paintings", was written at the age of 25. He also carried out in-depth research into the history of landscape painting at the end of the 4th century, including the works of Gu Kaizhi of the Eastern Jin dynasty (317–420), Zhan Ziqian of the Sui dynasty (581–618) and Jing Hao of the Five Dynasties period (907–960), as well as Wu Daozi, Li Sixun, Li Zhaodao and Zhang Yanyuan of the Tang dynasty (618–907). He worked very hard to imitate paintings by Gao Kegong and Ni Zan of the Yuan dynasty (1271–1368); Chen Hongshou of the Ming dynasty (1368–1644); and Cheng Sui, Kun Can, Zha Shibiao, Gong Xian, Mei Qing, Wui Li, Yun Shouping and Shi Tao of the Qing dynasty (1644–1911), finally becoming one of the master painters of his age. In this capacity he succeeded Huang Binhong, who had created a new style of landscape painting called "Baoshi's texture strokes" basing on the cattle-hair strokes of Wang Meng of the Yuan dynasty.

Painter 
As well as painting landscapes, Fu Baoshi was also an accomplished painter of figures. His paintings of ancient Chinese figures from the 3rd and 4th centuries BC are particularly acclaimed.

As a leader of the so-called New Chinese Painting Movement, which reformed traditional Chinese painting after 1949, Fu stood out from most of his contemporaries with his great passion for art, and his innovative brushwork and unique picture composition.

Fu's reforms were followed by a group of artists in Nanjing where he then lived. He was recognized as the founder of the Nanjing-based New Jinling School of Fine Arts. The school included such important artists as Chen Zhifo (1896–1962), Qian Songyan (1898–1985), Song Wenzhi (1919–1999), Wei Zixi (1915–2002) and Ya Ming (1924–2002).

Fu Baoshi was a great admirer of Shi Tao and, at the age of 18, changed his name to "Bao Shi" – meaning embracing "Shitao". He even wrote a chronicle of Shitao, recording his life experiences and social activities as well as his art creations. Fu Baoshi admitted that he was obsessed with the study of Shitao's painting.

Family lineage 
Father: Fu De-Tai 傅德泰
Wife: Luo Shi-Hui 羅時慧

Eldest Son: Fu Xiao-Shi 傅小石
Second Son: Fu Er-Shi 傅二石

Eldest Daughter: Fu Yi-Shan 傅益珊 
Second Daughter: Fu Yi-Xuan (Fu Yick Suen) 傅益璇
Third Daughter: Fu Yi-Yao 傅益瑤
Youngest Daughter: Fu Yi-Yu 傅益玉

Granddaughter: Fu Shan-shan 傅珊珊 Jenny Pat 傅蕾蕾

Bibliography 

 Fu Baoshi.  Zhongguo Shuhua Lilun (Theories of Chinese Paintings).  The Commercial Press, 1935.
 Fu Baoshi.  Shitao Shangren Nianpu (Chronological Biography of Shitao).  Beijing and Shanghai Weekly P., 1948.
 Fu Boashi. Zhongguo de Renwu Hua He Shanshui Hua (Chinese Figural and Landscape Paintings). Shanghai Cultural Publishing House, 1955.
 Fu Baoshi. Zhongguo de Huihua (Chinese Paintings). China Classical Art Publishing House, 1958.
 Fu Baoshi. Xiandai Zhongguo Hua (Modern Chinese Paintings). Beijing: People's Fine Art Publishing House, 1961.
 Fu Baoshi and Guan Shanyuan et al. Meishu Yiwgadai Jinyantan (Speaking from Experience of Art Creation). Shanghai People's Fine Art Publishing House, 1961.
 Fu Baoshi. Shan He Xin Mao (New Appearances of Mountains and Rivers). Nanjing: Jiangsu People's Publishing House, 1962.
 Fu Baoshi. Guohua Shanshui Jiexi (Explanations of Chinese Landscape Paintings). Taipei: Taiwan Tiantong Publishing House, 1973.
 Zhao Puchu. Paintings and Calligraphy of Jinling. Nanjing: Jinling Shuhuashe, 1981.
 Fu Baoshi Shuxie Ji (Fu Baoshi's Sketches Collection). Nanjing: Jiangsu Fine Art Publishing House, 1985.
 Hui Laiping ed.. Complete Collection of Han Mo Magazine. Hong Kong: Han Mo Xuan Publishing Co. Ltd., 1990 – 2006.
 Jiangxi Provincial Historical Records Research Committee, Xinyu Municipal Historical Records Research Committee ed.. Fu Baoshi – Jiangxi Historical Records Vol. 44. Xinyu: Jiangxi People's Publishing House, 1992.
 Gao Yuzhen ed.. Paintings by Fu Pao-Shih. Taipei: National Museum of History, 1994.
 Chen Chuanxi. China Famous Painters Collection—Fu Baoshi. Shijiazhuang: Hebei Educational Publishing House, 2000.
 Chen Chuanxi.  Chinese Famous Paintiners – Fu Baoshi.  Hebei Educational Publishing House, 2000.
 Ye Zonghao.  Collection of Fu Baoshi Art Essays. Shanghai Rarebooks Publishing House, 2003.
 Ye Zonghao. Chronological Biography of Fu Baoshi. Shanghai Rarebooks Publishing House, 2004.
 Fu Baoshi Memorial. Qi Ming Wei Xin – Collection of Fu Baoshi Centennial Memorial Essays. Zhengzhou: Henan Fine Art Publishing House, 2004.
 Qi Ming Wei Xin – Fu Baoshi Centennial Memorial. Exhibition of Private Collection of Fu Baoshi's Works, 2004.
 Ye Zonghao. The World of Fu Baoshi. Taipei: Shi Zh Tang Publishing Co. Ltd., 2004.

See also
Fu Baoshi Memorial Food Court

References

External links
 Fu Baoshi and his Painting Gallery at China Online Museum
 China Culture Introduction on Fu Baoshi
 Fu Baoshi Article at Artcyclopedia
 Fu Baoshi on Artnet

Chinese art historians
Modern artists
Republic of China painters
Painters from Jiangxi
1904 births
1965 deaths
People from Xinyu
20th-century Chinese historians
Republic of China historians
People's Republic of China historians
Historians from Jiangxi